The Port of Marseille is a 1907 oil on canvas Pointillist painting by Paul Signac, now in the Hermitage Museum, St Petersburg, Russia. The city's ships and port were a favourite subject of the painter, who also produced The Port of Marseille (1884), A View of Marseille (1905) and The Port of Marseille (1931).

See also
List of paintings by Paul Signac

References

External links

20th century in Marseille
Paintings by Paul Signac
Paintings in the collection of the Hermitage Museum
1907 paintings